Georges Run is an unincorporated community in Jefferson County, in the U.S. state of Ohio.

History
A post office called Georges Run was established in 1904, and remained in operation until 1907. The community took its name from nearby Georges Run creek.

References

Unincorporated communities in Jefferson County, Ohio
Unincorporated communities in Ohio